Kaj Ramsteijn (born 17 January 1990) is a Dutch footballer who plays as a centre back for Kozakken Boys in the Tweede Divisie.

Club career
Kaj Ramsteijn started at the age of 10 in the Feyenoord youth academy, coming over from DWO Zoetermeer. As a central defender he faced a lot of competition in the first squad of Feyenoord. Mid June 2010 he transferred to SBV Excelsior. He signed a 2-year contract that will keep him at SBV Excelsior until the summer of 2012. He made his professional début on 22 September 2010 in a match against WKE Emmen. His début in the starting 11 was on 24 October 2010 against Ajax. Ramsteijn made his first goal in a match against Willem II on 27 November 2010. The game ended in a 1–1 draw.
After his first season at professional level, Ramsteijn was rewarded for his good season with a transfer to his former club Feyenoord, who has an extensive partnership agreement with Excelsior, together with team-mates Guyon Fernandez and Miquel Nelom.

In 2013, he was hired by Sparta Rotterdam and a year prior to it signed a 2-year contract with Feyenoord.

References

External links
Voetbal International profile 
Netherlands stats at OnsOranje 
Kaj Ramsteijn stats on Voetbalzone

1990 births
Living people
Association football central defenders
Dutch footballers
Netherlands under-21 international footballers
Eredivisie players
Eerste Divisie players
Eliteserien players
Excelsior Rotterdam players
Feyenoord players
VVV-Venlo players
Sparta Rotterdam players
Almere City FC players
Primeira Liga players
C.S. Marítimo players
Aalesunds FK players
Dutch expatriate footballers
Dutch expatriate sportspeople in Portugal
Footballers from Zoetermeer
Expatriate footballers in Portugal
Expatriate footballers in Norway
Dutch expatriate sportspeople in Norway
Tweede Divisie players
Kozakken Boys players
Norwegian First Division players